Budoia is a comune (municipality) in the Province of Pordenone at the foot of the Dolomites mountain range in the Italian region Friuli-Venezia Giulia, located about  northwest of Trieste and about  northwest of Pordenone.

The municipality of Budoia contains the frazioni (subdivisions, mainly villages and hamlets) Dardago and Santa Lucia.

Budoia borders the following municipalities: Aviano, Fontanafredda, Polcenigo, Tambre.

Demographic evolution

References

External links
Official Site of the comune
Site of Artugna
Site of Pro Loco

Cities and towns in Friuli-Venezia Giulia